"Chester" is a patriotic anthem composed by William Billings and sung during the American Revolutionary War. Billings wrote the first version of the song for his 1770 songbook The New England Psalm Singer, and made improvements for the version in his The Singing Master's Assistant (1778).  It is the latter version that is best known today.

The curious title of the song reflects a common practice of Billings's day, in which tunes were labeled with (often arbitrarily chosen) place names.  Billings's song evidently has little more to do with any particular town named Chester than his famous hymn "Africa" has to do with Africa.  The idea behind this practice was that by labeling the tunes independently, one could sing them to different words without creating confusion (indeed, this later did happen; see below).

Tune in version of 1778

 
Parts labeled "Treble, Counter, Tenor, and Bass" correspond to the modern SATB four-voice choir.  However, the melody is in the tenor part, not the treble part.

Lyrics
Although this cannot be established with certainty, it appears that these lyrics are by Billings himself.

Let tyrants shake their iron rod,
And Slav'ry clank her galling chains,
We fear them not, we trust in God,
New England's God forever reigns.

Howe and Burgoyne and Clinton too,
With Prescot and Cornwallis join'd,
Together plot our Overthrow,
In one Infernal league combin'd.

When God inspir'd us for the fight,
Their ranks were broke, their lines were forc'd,
Their ships were Shatter'd in our sight,
Or swiftly driven from our Coast.

The Foe comes on with haughty Stride;
Our troops advance with martial noise,
Their Vet'rans flee before our Youth,
And Gen'rals yield to beardless Boys.

What grateful Off'ring shall we bring?
What shall we render to the Lord?
Loud Halleluiahs let us Sing,
And praise his name on ev'ry Chord.

Later uses
The song was later provided with religious (as opposed to patriotic) words by Philip Doddridge, and in this form is a favorite of Sacred Harp singers.  The Doddridge words are as follows:

Let the high heav'ns your songs invite,
These spacious fields of brilliant light,
Where sun and moon and planets roll,
And stars that glow from pole to pole.

Sun, moon, and stars convey Thy praise,
'Round the whole earth and never stand,
So when Thy truth began its race,
It touched and glanced on ev'ry hand.

A slightly altered version of this text and the music by Billings was recorded in 1975 by the Old Stoughton Musical Society for their LP album, "An Appeal to Heaven".

The modern American composer William Schuman employed the tune of "Chester" in his New England Triptych (1956) and later expanded it into his Chester Overture.

Bernard Herrmann quoted the tune prominently in his score for the Colonial Williamsburg orientation film, Williamsburg: the Story of a Patriot.

An instrumental version of the song was used as background music for CBS's Bicentennial Minutes segments.

HBO's John Adams has a scene in episode 1 where a group of men sang this song out loud together.

There is a variation of Chester called Chester Variations which is a concert band piece arranged by Elliot Del Borgo.

Book
 The Singing Master's Assistant, in which the final version of "Chester" was published, is in print today in a scholarly edition by Hans Nathan (University Press of Virginia, 1977).
 The Stoughton Musical Society's Centennial Collection of Sacred Music, which contains a version with the later text and was published in Boston in 1878; reprint by DaCapo Press, 1980, with New Introduction by Roger L. Hall.

References

External links
Let Tyrants Shake Their Iron Rods at the Cyber Hymnal
Chester

American patriotic songs
1770 compositions
Songs of the American Revolutionary War
Hymn tunes
Compositions by William Billings